James Clarence Archer  (28 July 1900 – 23 December 1980) was an Australian public servant and Administrator of the Northern Territory. Archer, Northern Territory is named after him.

References 

1900 births
1980 deaths
Administrators of the Northern Territory
Members of the Northern Territory Legislative Council
Australian Officers of the Order of the British Empire
Australian public servants